The Nigerian Television Authority or NTA is a Nigerian government-owned and partly commercial broadcast station. Originally known as Nigerian Television (NTV), it was inaugurated in 1977 with a monopoly on national television broadcasting, after a takeover of regional television stations by military governmental authorities in 1976. After declining interest from the public in government-influenced programming, it lost its monopoly over television broadcasting in Nigeria in the 1990s.

The NTA runs the largest television network in Nigeria with stations in several parts of the country. It is widely viewed as the "authentic voice" of the Nigerian government.

History

Early broadcast stations in Nigeria
The first television station in Nigeria, the Western Nigerian Government Broadcasting Corporation (WNTV) began broadcasting on 31 October 1959. Its first Chairman was Olapade Obisesan, a lawyer trained in the United Kingdom and the son of Akinpelu Obisesan, an Ibadan socialite and first president of the Cooperative Bank of Nigeria. Vincent Maduka, a former engineer, was the General Manager. The station was based in Ibadan, making it the first broadcast station in tropical Africa, although more northern parts of Africa already had television stations.

In March 1962, Radio-Television Kaduna/Radio Kaduna Television (RKTV) was established. It was based in Kaduna and was operated by the Broadcasting Company of Northern Nigeria. RKTV also provided coverage for the central northern states; it opened new stations on Zaria in July 1962 and on Kano in February 1963. Later in 1977, it was re-branded NTV-Kaduna.

In April 1962, the Nigerian Broadcasting Corporation (NBC) was established as a federal government-owned service based in the city of Lagos, broadcasting to the southwestern states.

MidWest TV was established in 1972 as a TV broadcaster of Port Harcourt. It was run by the state government in Benin.

Benue-Plateau Television Corporation (BPTV) was established in 1974 with headquarters in Jos. It was the first television station to launch regular/permanent colour broadcasts in Africa. The colour test transmissions began on 1 October 1975. BPTV was later re-branded as NTV-Jos.

NTA was founded in 1977. By May 1977 all the state television broadcasters listed above were merged and re-branded as Nigerian Television (NTV) and owned by the Nigerian Television Authority.  Obisesan and Makuda continued in the roles of Chairman and General Manager of NTA. As of 1979, NTA had reached about 20% of the Nigerian population.

Early programming

1977–1990: Networking locally produced content
Dramatic programming such as serials and anthology series were rare in regional television stations before NTA was founded in 1977. TV shows such as Moses Olaiya's Alawada on WNTV (later NTA Ibadan), Village Headmaster and Hotel de Jordan on NTA Benin became available more widely after the merger. Apart from these few notable shows, there was little original content in dramatic series production during the 1970s. By 1980, when the new NTA network took over state-owned broadcasting stations in the country, there was a concerted effort to increase the quality of locally produced content. NTA began offering support to the production of notable country-wide network programs such as Tales by Moonlight, Cockcrow at Dawn, and Mirror in the Sun as early as 1977. In 1982, a drama produced by NTA Sokoto, Moment of Truth won a prize at the fifth URTNA festival held in Algiers. 

To cultivate interest in original broadcast content from Nigerian producers, the network set a ceiling of 20% broadcasting time to be allocated to foreign programming, during a period when the cost of acquiring those programs was much less than the locally produced ones. With just a portion of the broadcast week for schedulers to work with, foreign imports were routinely some of the most popular shows from the UK and the U.S., such as Yes Minister, Charlie's Angels, Dallas, Dynasty, and Falcon Crest. Cockcrow at Dawn, an agriculture promotional drama partially sponsored by UBA and produced by Peter Igho, who directed the award-winning Moment of Truth, emerged as one of the first nationally televised drama series in Nigeria. However, it was short-lived due to "government structure syndrome". Acada Campus, a show produced by Bode Sowande, was also short-lived. These series were widely available thanks to NTA's monopoly on broadcasting.

In the 1980s, a series of critically acclaimed soap operas were promoted on the network. The first was Laolu Ogunniyi's Wind Against My Soul, followed by For Better or Worse and Lola Fani Kayode's Mirror in the Sun. The last of these, produced in 1983, was well-received by critics, but its broadcast was interrupted after two years due to a lack of financial support. In the mid-1980s, another group of soap operas dominated the airwaves, including the short-lived Behind the Clouds and Turning Wheels.

In 1984, NTA began to broadcast Tales by Moonlight, a children's programme narrating traditional African folklore stories. The network also broadcast Adelia Onyedibia's adaptation of Chinua Achebe's Things Fall Apart in 1986.

The network also promoted notable comedy series during this period such as New Masquerade and Ken Saro Wiwa's Basi and Company. One of the earliest network comedies was House no. 13 (1984) starring Wale Ogunyemi;, a sitcom satirizing the social and urban lifestyle of Nigerians. Basi and Company, a critically acclaimed comedy series starring Albert Egbe was broadcast in 1985. Village Headmaster, Koko Close and Samanja, three series spoken in Nigerian Pidgin, were aired nationwide.

1990s: Partial commercialization
Under the structural adjustment program initiated by the government of Ibrahim Babangida, NTA was required to commercialize some of its time slots in an attempt to move away from public broadcasting towards a partially commercial broadcasting network. This led to the addition of sponsored and brokered religious programs and the live transmission of weddings and funeral services on the network.

NTA also continued to show acclaimed soap operas such as Mind Bending by Lola Fani-Kayode, Ripples by Zeb Ejiro and Checkmate by Amaka Igwe. Ripples, which began in 1988, became the network's longest-running soap opera, ending in 1993. Checkmate by Amaka Igwe, starring Richard Mofe Damijo, Bob-Manuel Udokwu, Ego Boyo, Kunle Bamtefa and Mildred Iweka, launched the career of many Nigerian celebrities. Following the end of Ripples and Checkmate, NTA promoted the shows Blossom and Fortunes, but these series suffered from declining viewership. At this time NTA, which previously had a broadcast monopoly, faced competition from new entrants such as Africa Independent Television. To compete, the network introduced prime time Latin American telenovelas such as The Rich Also Cry, Secrets of the Sand and Wild Rose.

Programming for children or for education usually occurred between 06:30pm and 07:00pm. Shows included Fun time, Readers club, Work it Out, and Take a Step.

In 1999, the network introduced breakfast television with A.M. Express.

News
News programming was central to NTA's and the government's efforts to forge national unity. The network ensured that news presenters did not simply read prepared scripts but acted as part of the news gathering team. As many of their early news writers came from print journalism, NTA made sure that writers understood the importance of writing for visual presentation. NTA introduced a new line of newscasters and reporters such as Ronke Ayuba, John Momoh, Cyril Stober, Bimbo Oloyede, Ruth Opia, Sienne Allwell-Brown and Sola Omole. Specialized news programmes like Frank Olise's Newsline were also introduced. The major news programmes were the Network News at Nine, a 5-minute News in Brief at 5:00pm, and a 15-minute Newscap at 11:00pm.

In the 1990s, NTA joined other state-owned stations in commercialising some aspects of news reporting by including festivals, social events, cultural and business activities in the news or as part of a news programme in return for the payment of a fee.

21st Century programming
As of 2013, mandatory network programming dominated the airtime of most local NTA stations. The local stations were offered a choice of a local broadcasting time from a specific time range.

During the daytime, magazine shows like A.M. Express, later renamed Good Morning Nigeria, aired for 2½ hours from 6:30am to 9:00am and from Monday to Friday, but other programs air once or twice every week. Network dramas like Super Story and Stand Up Nigeria were usually broadcast in the Tuesday and Thursday 8:00pm slot. Notable sports programs include On the Pitch on Mondays.

NTA, which previously had some original children's programming, formed a partnership with Viacom to broadcast Nickelodeon's programmes during its 5-7 pm time slot for children and instructional television.

Network news
NTA's news mostly reports on government activities. The major news production is Network News, an hour-long programme that airs at 9:00 pm Monday-Friday except on Wednesdays, when it is replaced with News Extra. Network News usually starts with news from the presidency, then news from the National Assembly, followed by ministries and state governments. Other news productions include News at 7 and Nationwide News at 4 pm. Investigative reporting and human stories are usually subordinate to covering government activities, with the exception of Newsline which airs on Sunday evenings. The 9pm news programme has one of the network's highest advertising rates for 30-second ads. Paid news segments such as 'News of Special Interest' are inserted into network broadcast news such as Newsline or the 9pm network news.

Other notable news productions include Panorama, One o'Clock Live, Inside the Senate, and You and Your Rep.

Imported programmes

Former
Animated
The Adventures of Teddy Ruxpin
The Adventures of the Little Prince
Atom Ant
Battle of the Planets
The Bear, The Tiger and the Others
Bertha
Biker Mice From Mars
Birdman and the Galaxy Trio
Bright Sparks
Captain Planet and the Planeteers
Casper the Friendly Ghost
Danger Mouse
Dennis the Menace
Dino-Riders
DoDo, The Kid from Outer Space
Dungeons & Dragons
Fables of the Green Forest
Groovie Goolies
G-Force
Harlem Globetrotters
He-Man and the Masters of the Universe
The Incredible Hulk
Inspector Gadget
Jimbo and the Jet-Set
Johnny Bravo
King Rollo
Little Wizards
The Magic School Bus
Muppet Babies
The New Shmoo
Ovide and the Gang
Pigeon Street
Pingu
Pinky and the Brain
Samurai Jack
Samurai X
Secret Squirrel
SilverHawks
Speed Racer
Sport Billy
SuperTed
Teenage Mutant Ninja Turtles
ThunderCats
Thundersub
Tom and Jerry
Towser
Victor & Hugo: Bunglers in Crime
Voltron: Defender of The Universe

Children's Programmes
3-2-1 Contact
Animal Kwackers
The ChuckleHounds
Fraggle Rock
Power Rangers
Rentaghost
Sesame Street
Terrahawks
The Waterville Gang

Drama
Charlie's Angels
Doctor Who
Touched by an Angel
Tour of Duty

Comedy
Mind Your Language
The Muppet Show
Sledge Hammer!
Some Mothers Do 'Ave 'Em

Sports
Telematch

NTA branches and network centres 
As of 2014, NTA had 101 stations in state capitals and towns of Nigeria, nine of which are network centres. The network centres mostly derive from Nigeria's early broadcast stations, and are located at Ibadan, Jos, Enugu, Kaduna, Lagos, Benin, Makurdi, Maiduguri,Sokoto and Port Harcourt 

 NTA Aba
 NTA Abeokuta
 NTA Abuja
 NTA Plus Abuja
 NTA Ado-Ekiti
 NTA Akure
 NTA Asaba
 NTA Awka
 NTA Bauchi
 NTA Benin
 NTA Birnin-Kebbi
 NTA Calabar
 NTA Damaturu
 NTA Dutse
 NTA Enugu
 NTA Gombe
 NTA Gusau
 NTA Ibadan
 NTA Ife
 NTA Ijebu-Ode
 NTA Ilorin
 NTA International
 NTA Jalingo
 NTA Jos
 NTA Kaduna
 NTA Kafanchan
 NTA Kano
 NTA Katsina
 NTA 2 Channel 5 Lagos
 NTA Channel 10 Lagos
 NTA Lafia
 NTA Lokoja
 NTA Maiduguri
 NTA Makurdi
 NTA Minna
 NTA Ondo
 NTA Osogbo
 NTA Owerri
 NTA Oyo
 NTA Port Harcourt
 NTA Sokoto
 NTA Uyo
 NTA Yenagoa
 NTA Yola
 NTA Sapele
 NTA Education
 NTA Sports

Criticism
NTA is partially funded through a state subvention. NTA has faced criticism that the content it covers is influenced by government and politicians. This interference is said to diminish the professionalism of newscasters on NTA.

The NTA has been criticized by performing artists such as Becky Umeh for allegedly pressuring her and other artists to align their expression with government propaganda goals. In an editorial on 18 October 2009, the Lagos newspaper The Guardian stated that "the federal government-owned television network, the Nigerian Television Authority, (NTA) is arguably the largest of its type in Africa, but it is yet to have the operational freedom required to maximize its potential."

It has been suggested that the proliferation of NTA stations in every state capital is not useful for broadcasting but is driven by political reasons. The network has also been criticized for using antiquated technology.

Related services
NTA's digital Pay TV service, Startimes, was established in 2010 as a partnership with Star Communications Technology of China. Additional NTA channels  include NTA Yoruba, NTA Ibo, NTA Hausa, NTA Sports 24 and NTA Parliamentary Channel.

International broadcast
A number of NTA programmes can be viewed online via Africast as well as TelAfric Television in the US and Canada. NTA News bulletins are frequently aired on Africa Independent Television and BEN Television in the United Kingdom, where the station was also launched on Sky on channel 213 in 2008. It moved to channel 202 on 1 September 2008 to give space to new channels. In early March 2010, NTA refused to broadcast as a pay-per-view channel on Sky, and was removed from Sky EPG on the following day. The channel returned on Sky in the UK on 20 June 2018 on channel 781.

NTA is also available on the IPTV platform SuncasTV, and via free-to-air satellite on Galaxy 19, Intelsat 905 and Intelsat 507.

Notable staff
Eugenia Abu - Newsreader and correspondent (Network News, Newsline), NTA Network 
Muhammad Kudu Abubakar - Newsreader (Network News), NTA Network
Art Alade - Presenter (The Bar Beach Show), NTA Lagos
Chris Anyanwu - Newsreader and reporter, NTA Aba
Ben Murray-Bruce - NTA director-general (1999-2003) 
Julie Coker - Newsreader and presenter (Julie's World), NTA Lagos
Sadiq Daba - Producer and editor, NTA Sokoto and NTA Jos 
Funmi Iyanda - Sports reporter and presenter (New Dawn On Ten), NTA Lagos 
Chuka Momah - Presenter (NTA Sports, Big Fight of the Decade, Sports Spectacular), NTA Network
John Momoh - Newsreader (Network News and Tonight At Nine), NTA Network
Tade Ogidan - Producer/Director, NTA 2 Channel 5 
 Boniface Offokaja - first Nigerian head of news department, NTV (1963-) 
Onyeka Onwenu - Newsreader and reporter, NTA Lagos; presenter (Contact and Who's On?), NTA Network
Nkem Owoh - Producer and newsreader, NTA Enugu
Bimbo Roberts - Newsreader (Network News), NTA Network
Cyril Stober - Newsreader (Network News), NTA Network
Alex Usifo - Operations assistant/producer, NTA Benin
Ruth Benamaisia-Opia - Newscaster (Network News, Newsline)

External links 

 Official site
 NTA Field Site

See also
Bauchi State Television

References

Television in Nigeria
Television channels and stations established in 1959
1976 establishments in Nigeria
Public broadcasting in Nigeria